WEC 27: Marshall vs. McElfresh was the third mixed martial arts event held by the World Extreme Cagefighting under Zuffa management. The event was held on May 12, 2007.

UFC lightweight fighter and future WEC Lightweight Champion Jamie Varner was expected to make his promotional debut on this card against Richard Crunkilton, but the fight was removed from the card after Varner suffered training injuries.

Results

Reported Payout
The following is the reported payout to the fighters as reported to the Nevada State Athletic Commission. It does not include sponsor money or "locker room" bonuses often given by the WEC.

Doug Marshall: $8,000 (includes $4,000 win bonus) def. Justin McElfresh: $3,000
Jason Miller: $30,000 ($15,000 win bonus) def. Hiromitsu Miura: $3,000
Ariel Gandulla: $6,000 ($3,000 win bonus) def. Gary Padilla: $3,000
Sherron Leggett: $6,000 ($3,000 win bonus) def. Charlie Kohler: $5,000
Marcus Hicks: $6,000 ($3,000 win bonus) def. Sergio Gomez: $4,000
Tommy Speer: $4,000 ($2,000 win bonus) def. Sidney Silva: $4,000
Manny Tapia: $8,000 ($4,000 win bonus) def. Brandon Foxworth: $4,000
Ed Ratcliff: $6,000 ($3,000 win bonus) def. Johnny Sampaio: $2,000
Eric Schambari: $6,000 ($3,000 win bonus) def. Art Santore: $6,000

See also 
 World Extreme Cagefighting
 List of WEC champions
 List of WEC events
 2007 in WEC

References

MMA on Tap – WEC 27: Las Vegas Results

External links
Official WEC website
Official Sherdog fight card

World Extreme Cagefighting events
2007 in mixed martial arts
Mixed martial arts in Las Vegas
2007 in sports in Nevada
Hard Rock Hotel and Casino (Las Vegas)